Neuhausen/Erzgeb. (lit. Neuhausen/Ore Mountains) is a municipality in the district of Mittelsachsen, in Saxony, Germany. It consists of Neuhausen proper and the Ortsteile (divisions) Dittersbach, Frauenbach, Heidelbach, Cämmerswalde, Rauschenbach, Neuwernsdorf and Deutschgeorgenthal. Neuhausen hosts the first nutcracker museum in Europe, which houses more than 5,000 examples, the largest collection of nutcrackers in the world and is also known as a location for winter sports.

Culture and sights

Museums

Europe's first nutcracker museum 
World renown is the first and largest nutcracker museum in Europe with around 5,000 exhibits from 30 countries (as at April 2009).

Glassworks Museum of the Ore Mountains 

The Glassworks Museum of the Ore Mountains (Glashüttenmuseum des Erzgebirges) is located in the old socage vault of  Purschenstein Castle and includes a replica glassworks from the time of Georgius Agricola, a workshop and other documents and tools associated with Ore Mountain glassmaking as well as the history of Neuhausen and Purschenstein.

References 

Mittelsachsen